Muslim historiography may refer to:

Tarikh, the Arabic, Persian and Turkic word for historiography
Muslim historians
Historiography of early Islam

See also
History of Islam
Islamic geography
Muslim scholars